The Uniters for Reform Coalition ( I'tilāf Muttaḥidūn lil-Iṣlāḥ) is a Sunni political coalition in Iraq.

History
The coalition was formed in December 2012, composing ten groups, and led by Usama al-Nujayfi. Among the groups composing Muttahidoon were several of the largest Sunni political blocs, including the Ninawa-based al-Hadba list, the bloc of former Awakening Movement leader Ahmed Abu Risha, the National Future Gathering bloc of former Finance Minister Rafi al-Issawi, the Iraqi Islamic Party, and the Iraqi Turkmen Front. Altogether the parties aligned with the coalition had won 42 seats in the 2010 parliamentary election.

For the 2013 governorate elections the coalition competed in Ninewa, Salah ad-Din, Baghdad, Anbar, and Basra. In Diyala and Babil the coalition joined with other political groups, running as Iraqiyat Diyala and Iraqiyat Babil.

Following the 2013 governorate elections the Oum Rabih Tribes’ National Gathering of Hussein Khalaf entered into an alliance with Muttahidoon on 25 June, thereby forming the largest bloc on the Ninawa Governorate Council.

The party advocates the creation of a Sunni federal region in Iraq.

Members
The following parties make up the coalition:
National Movement for Development and Reform – led by Mohammad Nasir Dali Ahmed
Al-Hadba – led by Usama al-Nujayfi and Atheel al-Nujaifi
Iraqi Sahwa Conference – led by Ahmed Bazi Ftikhan Abd al-Hamid
Civil Gathering for Reform (Work) – led by Salem Abdullah Ahmed Nasir
National Independent Tribal Gathering – led by Omar Hejil Hamd Shabib
National Gathering of Um al-Rabeain Tribes – led by Hussein Khalaf Alaw Hamid
Protectors of Iraq Movement (Right) – led by Ahmed Abd Hamdai Shawish al-Massari
Baghdad Belt Gathering – led by Talal Khudhair Abbas Gaed al-Zobai
People of Shirqat Independent Union – led by Mudhhi Hussein Awadh Shalal
Gathering of Saladin for Development – led by Ammar Youssif Hamoud Latouf
Land of the Grandfathers Gathering – led by Daham Iwayed Multar Ahmed
National Future Gathering – led by Dhafir Nadhim Salman Mahmoud
Iraqi Turkmen Front – led by Arshad Rashad Fatih Allah Abd al-Razaq
Iraq Awakening and Independents National Alliance
Iraqi Islamic Party

Criticisms
The coalition has been criticized by other Sunni political formations aligned with Prime Minister Nouri al-Maliki of following a Muslim Brotherhood direction, and there have been insinuations of the group having ties with groups outside Iraq.

Electoral results

Iraqi Parliament

Governorate Councils

References

See also 

 List of political parties in Iraq

Political party alliances in Iraq
Sunni Islamic political parties